Eddy Suarez is a Cuban Olympic boxer. He represented his country in the featherweight division at the 1992 Summer Olympics. He won his first bout against Lee Chil-Gun, then lost won in his second bout against Mohamed Soltani, but lost in his third bout against Faustino Reyes.

References

1969 births
Living people
Cuban male boxers
Olympic boxers of Cuba
Boxers at the 1992 Summer Olympics
Featherweight boxers